The Ambassador of Australia to Iraq is an officer of the Australian Department of Foreign Affairs and Trade and the head of the Embassy of the Commonwealth of Australia to the Republic of Iraq in Baghdad. The position has the rank and status of an Ambassador Extraordinary and Plenipotentiary and is currently held by Paula Ganly since December 2020. 

Iraq and Australia have enjoyed official diplomatic relations since the Australian government of Gough Whitlam recognised the Iraqi Republic in 1973. Contacts between Australia and Iraq however were much earlier, dating back to British Mandatory Iraq and the British Protectorate Kingdom of Iraq from 1935.

On 2 December 1973, Foreign Minister Don Willesee announced that Iraq and Australia would establish diplomatic relations with the Australian Ambassador in Beirut to be accredited to Iraq. A resident Ambassador was not appointed until 1976, with Neil Truscott becoming the first resident Ambassador in early 1977. With the Iraqi invasion of Kuwait starting the First Gulf War in August 1990, relations between the two countries became severely strained and diplomatic relations were severed in January 1991 with the withdrawal of Ambassador Peter Lloyd immediately prior to Operation Desert Storm. Relations remained severed until the overthrow of the regime of Saddam Hussein and the establishment of the Australian Mission in Baghdad on 3 May 2003, immediately following the 2003 invasion of Iraq. This was upgraded to an embassy 29 June 2004 following the transfer of sovereign authority to the Iraqi Interim Government.

Heads of Mission

See also
Foreign relations of Australia

References

External links
 Australian Embassy, Iraq

Ambassadors of Australia to Iraq
Iraq
Australia